This is a list of notable weather services.

Criteria for inclusion:
 weather service is notable enough to have its own article on Wikipedia
 notability is established by reliable sources

Radio, TV and online services

References

Weather services